The Big Sleep is a live album by the English new wave band The Only Ones, produced by John Perry.  It was recorded at the Paradiso, Amsterdam.  It includes five songs not heard as live versions before. The album was issued on both vinyl LP and CD formats. It was re-released on vinyl in 2010 by Vinyl Lovers.

Track listing
 "As My Wife Says"
 "In Betweens"
 "Programme"
 "(Oh Lucinda) Love Becomes a Habit"
 "The Big Sleep"
 "Language Problem"
 "Miles from Nowhere"
 "Beast"
 "Another Girl, Another Planet"
 "Peter and the Pets"
 "City of Fun"
 "Trouble in the World"
 "Me and My Shadow"
 "The Immortal Story"

Personnel
The Only Ones
Peter Perrett - guitar, vocals
John Perry - guitar
Alan Mair - bass guitar
Mike Kellie - drums

References

External links
 Jungle Records – The Big Sleep.
 

The Only Ones albums
2007 live albums